is an airport located in Kirishima, Kagoshima Prefecture, Japan,  northeast of Kagoshima-Chūō Station in Kagoshima City. It is the second-busiest airport in Kyushu after Fukuoka Airport.

Japan Air Commuter, a regional affiliate of Japan Airlines, and New Japan Aviation have their headquarters at the airport.

Overview 
The airport is located 30km northeast of Kagoshima City. Although access by train is poor, access via expressway is good because it is close to the E3 Kyushu Expressway Mizobe Kagoshima Airport Interchange.

History

The airport opened in 1972, replacing a former Imperial Japanese Navy airfield in the Kamoike area near the city center, which had served as the city's main airport since 1957. The site of the former airport was re-developed as a "new town" with office buildings and high-density housing projects, and is now the site of the Kagoshima Prefecture government office, among other buildings.

The airport's runway had an initial length of 2,500 m, which was extended to 3,000 m in 1980. An international terminal opened in 1982 and a cargo terminal opened in 1987.

Air Niugini, Cathay Pacific Airways, China Airlines and Nauru Airlines provided international service to Kagoshima from the 1970s to the 1980s, and JAL operated a route to Singapore via Hong Kong and Bangkok during the 1980s. Kagoshima served as the destination of the final scheduled NAMC YS-11 flight in 2006.

Facilities

Kagoshima's domestic terminal has nine gates. ANA and JAL both operate lounges in the terminal. The international terminal has a single gate.

Airlines and destinations

Passenger

Statistics

References

External links

 Airport website
 
 

Airports in Kagoshima Prefecture
Airports established in 1972
1972 establishments in Japan
Kirishima, Kagoshima